May is a town in Harper County, Oklahoma, United States. The population was 39 at the 2010 census.

Geography
May is located on U.S. Highway 270 at the intersection with State Highway 46, approximately 25 miles northwest of Woodward. This puts May at  (36.616536, -99.749363).

May was served by the Northwestern District of the Missouri–Kansas–Texas Railroad until that line's abandonment in January 1973.

Demographics

As of the census of 2000, there were 33 people, 17 households, and 7 families residing in the town. There were 27 housing units at an average density of 150.2 per square mile (57.9/km2). The racial makeup of the town was 100.00% White. Hispanic or Latino of any race were 3.03% of the population.

There were 17 households, out of which 17.6% had children under the age of 18 living with them, 41.2% were married couples living together, and 58.8% were non-families. 47.1% of all households were made up of individuals, and 17.6% had someone living alone who was 65 years of age or older. The average household size was 1.94 and the average family size was 3.00.

In the town, the population was spread out, with 18.2% under the age of 18, 6.1% from 18 to 24, 30.3% from 25 to 44, 33.3% from 45 to 64, and 12.1% who were 65 years of age or older. The median age was 41 years. For every 100 females, there were 120.0 males. For every 100 females age 18 and over, there were 145.5 males.

The median income for a household in the town was $45,625, and the median income for a family was $50,313. Males had a median income of $30,833 versus $19,167 for females. The per capita income for the town was $20,319. None of the population and none of the families were below the poverty line.

Pop culture
May is the hometown of one of the major characters of Stephen King's The Stand, the mentally handicapped Tom Cullen, who meets the deaf-mute drifter Nick Andros after Cullen gets drunk and passes out in the middle of the road. Andros mistakenly believes Cullen is dead and careens off his bike.

References

Further reading 
 Oklahoma Historical Society's Encyclopedia of Oklahoma History & Culture: May

Towns in Harper County, Oklahoma
Towns in Oklahoma